Sari Qayah (also Romanized as Sārī Qayah) is a village in Sain Rural District, in the Central District of Sarab County, East Azerbaijan Province, Iran. At the 2006 census, its population was 271, in 51 families.

References 

Populated places in Sarab County